NGC 4098 is an interacting pair of spiral galaxies located 330 million light-years away in the constellation Coma Berenices. NGC 4098 was discovered by astronomer William Herschel on April 26, 1785. It was then rediscovered by Hershel on December 27, 1786 was listed as NGC 4099. NGC 4098 is a member of the NGC 4065 Group.

NGC 4098 is interacting with the galaxy pair VV 62.

A candidate supernova of an unknown type, which was designated as SNhunt287 (PSN J12060084+2036183), was discovered in NGC 4098 on April 25, 2015.

References

External links

4098
038365
Coma Berenices
Astronomical objects discovered in 1785
Spiral galaxies
NGC 4065 Group
Interacting galaxies
07091